Czamara (from Polish language; plural czamary; also known in the English language as Cracow/Kraków coat; originally , , , Arabic: samur - fur coat) was a type of outer garment in the Polish–Lithuanian Commonwealth. It was worn there from the 16th century and came to the Commonwealth via Hungary from Turkey. It was first worn mostly by priests, and in the 18th century became a popular attire of (non-nobility) burghers. In the 19th century, the czamara became a notable element of male Polish national and patriotic attire.

Czamara was a kind of a frock coat reaching up to the hips or thighs in a kontusz-like cut, lined with fur, with long, straight, narrow sleeves, and a lined, narrow, high collar, and decorative frogs.

Notes

Bibliography
 
 Encyklopedia Polski, Kraków 1996 s. 110.

Polish clothing
Lithuanian clothing
Coats (clothing)